Elizabeth Friedländer (10 October 1903 in Berlin, Germany – 1984 in Kinsale, Ireland), was a German born designer who later worked in England. She spent her life producing bookwork, calligraphy, and decorative designs from the 1920s until her death.

Elizabeth font
Born in 1903 to cultured and affluent parents, she eventually studied typography and calligraphy under E.R. Weiss at the Berlin Academy. Her magazine work for Die Dame, published by Ullstein, where she designed headings and lay-outs, attracted the attention of Georg Hartmann of the Bauer Type Foundry in Frankfurt, and he invited her to design a typeface. This was to become their Elisabeth-Antiqua — Elizabeth in English-speaking countries — although it was originally to have been Friedlander-Antiqua. Hitler came to power just as the type was ready for casting and Hartmann suggested that the name of the face be changed to Elisabeth, since Friedlander, a recognisably Jewish name, would be inadvisable in the current political conditions.

Nazi persecution: forced into exile
As a Jew in Germany she suffered from the mounting anti-Semitic laws that were brought in and had to apply for official registration to work, and was refused a permit. In her letter of refusal she was told that, as a 'non-Aryan', she '[lacked] the necessary reliability and fitness to participate in the creation and dissemination of German cultural values.'

She moved to Italy in 1936, where she was permitted to work so long as she was not politically active. She learnt the language and worked with the publisher Mondadori, but September 1938 brought harsh Italian Antisemitic Laws, threatening her with loss of rights and employment. Unable, as she had hoped, to go to the United States, where the New York office of the Bauer Foundry were eager to employ her, she obtained a Domestic Service permit for Britain and went to London with her two portfolios of work and an early 18th-century Klotz violin that had belonged to her mother.

Bookwork and Penguin Books
She learnt English and was eventually rescued from the drudgery of life as a domestic servant by Francis Meynell, who found work for her and became a supportive friend. By 1942 she was in charge of design at the Ministry of Information’s black propaganda unit, led by Ellic Howe, where she produced forged Wehrmacht and Nazi rubber stamps, false ration books, and so on, while at the same time carrying out freelance commissions.

By the end of the war she had a wide circle of friends as well as good contacts in the printing and publishing world. She decided to stay in Britain, became a naturalised citizen and anglicised her name. Later work included the series Britain in Pictures, patterned papers for Curwen and Penguin Books, decorative borders for Linotype, printer's flowers for Monotype, and calligraphy for the Roll of Honour at Sandhurst. She was responsible for many of the post-war designs of Penguin Books and the little Penguin logo when they were 25 years old.

Ireland
In the early 1960s she retired to County Cork, Ireland with her “life-long companion” Alessandro MacMahon, where with failing eyesight she continued working and took up gardening. She died in 1984. Many of her works were privately donated to the University College Cork.

References

New Borders: The Working Life of Elizabeth Friedlander, Incline Press, 1998

1903 births
1984 deaths
Date of death missing
German calligraphers
Prussian Academy of Arts alumni
Women calligraphers
German emigrants to the United Kingdom
Women graphic designers
German typographers and type designers